Al-Maimouna Sport Club, is an Iraqi football team based in Al-Maimouna District, Maysan, that plays in the Iraq Division Two.

Managerial history
  Hussein Radhi

See also 
 2021–22 Iraq Division Two

References

External links
 Al-Maimouna SC on Goalzz.com
 Iraq Clubs- Foundation Dates

1993 establishments in Iraq
Association football clubs established in 1993
Football clubs in Maysan